The Joint Institute for the Study of the Atmosphere and Ocean (JISAO) has existed since 1977 for the purpose of fostering research collaboration between National Oceanic and Atmospheric Administration (NOAA) Office of Oceanic and Atmospheric Research (OAR) and the University of Washington (UW). Dr. John K. Horne is the current director.

It is one of 16 NOAA Cooperative Institutes (CIs).

The JISAO research themes are:
 Climate research and impacts
 Marine ecosystems
 Environmental chemistry
 Ocean and coastal observations
 Seafloor processes
 Protection and restoration of marine resources
 Tsunami observations and modeling

References

Office of Oceanic and Atmospheric Research
Research institutes in the United States
Oceanographic organizations
Meteorological research institutes